A groom (short for bridegroom) is a male participant in a wedding ceremony.

Groom or Grooming may also refer to:

Occupations 
 Groom (profession), a person responsible for the feeding and care of horses
 One of the competitors in combined driving is called a groom

In the English/British Royal Household
 Groom of the Bedchamber, later named Groom in Waiting, a junior nobleman in attendance in the King's Bedchamber
 Groom of the Chamber, a rank of courtier in the Tudor royal court
 Groom of the Great Chamber, a junior nobleman in attendance (who would customarily also serve as King's Messenger)
 Groom of the Privy Chamber, a junior nobleman in attendance in the Chamber
 Groom of the Robes
 Groom of the Stool, later named Groom of the Stole, the senior nobleman in attendance in the King's Bedchamber

Places
 Groom, Texas, a town in Carson County, Texas, United States, location of the second largest cross in the western hemisphere
 Division of Groom, a Commonwealth Electoral Division in Queensland, Australia
 Groom Lake (salt flat), a geographic feature of the United States Military Area 51
 Groom Range, a mountain range in Nevada, United States

People
 Groom (surname), a surname (including a list of people with the name)

Film 
 The Groom, a 2016 Russian comedy film
 Groomed (film), a 2021 American documentary film

Grooming
 Child grooming, befriending a child, in the negative context of preparing them to accept abusive behavior
 LGBT grooming conspiracy theory, homophobic conspiracy theory 
 Personal grooming, or preening, in humans and other animals, a hygienic activity (caring for physical appearance)
 Dog grooming, the care provided for a dog's physical appearance (especially its coat and nails), or specific work done to enhance its appearance for a show
 Horse grooming, the daily hygienic care provided for horses, or specific work done on the horse to enhance its physical appearance for a show
 Male grooming, specific work done by men to enhance their physical appearance, or daily hygiene care done by men
 Social grooming, behavior between humans and other animals who live in proximity, helping bond and reinforce social structures
 Snow grooming, the process of preparing snow for recreational uses, such as skiing
 Traffic grooming, a technical activity in telecommunications

See also
 Bridegroom (disambiguation)
 Grom (disambiguation)
 Operant conditioning